Pygichaeta is a genus of beetles in the family Buprestidae, containing the following species:

 Pygichaeta babaulti (Thery, 1937)
 Pygichaeta fischeri (Kerremans, 1903)
 Pygichaeta fusca (Saunders, 1874)
 Pygichaeta parisii Obenberger, 1934
 Pygichaeta psilopteroides (Kerremans, 1899)
 Pygichaeta semigranosa (Solier, 1833)
 Pygichaeta strandi Obenberger, 1936

References

Buprestidae genera